Kamviri is a dialect of the Kamkata-vari language spoken by 5,000 to 10,000 of the Kom people of Afghanistan and Pakistan.  There are slight dialectal differences of the Kamviri speakers of Pakistan. The most used alternative names are Kati, Kamozi, Shekhani or Bashgali.

Phonology  
The inventory as described by Richard Strand. In addition, there is stress. 

The neutral articulatory posture, as in the reduced vowel , consists of the tip of the tongue behind the lower teeth and a raised tongue root is linked with a raised larynx, producing a characteristic pitch for unstressed vowels of about an octave above the pitch of a relaxed larynx.

Consonants 

 Sounds  are found in loanwords.
  can also be heard as bilabial  or a labial approximant .
 For most speakers, and especially in Kombřom,  becomes a retroflex flap .
  becomes a velar tap . 

 are phonetic affricates.

Nasals voice a following obstruent. 

Vowels 

 is  after another vowel,  after a laminal consonant and after . For some speakers, it is  after .

Vocabulary 
Pronouns:

1sg. õć (nominative), ĩa (accusative), ĩ (genitive)

1pl. imo (nominative/genitive), imoa (accusative)

2sg. tū (nominative), tua (accusative), tu (genitive)

2pl. šo (nominative/genitive), šoa (accusative)

Numbers:

1: ev

2: dū

3: tre

4: što

5: puc

6: ṣu

7: sut

8: uṣṭ

9: nu

10: duć

References

Bibliography

 The Kom. Retrieved July 2, 2006, from Richard F. Strand: Nuristan, Hidden Land of the Hindu-Kush .
 Strand, Richard F. (1973). Notes on the Nūristāni and Dardic Languages. Journal of the American Oriental Society.

External links

 
 
 

Nuristani languages of Afghanistan
Languages of Khyber Pakhtunkhwa
Nuristani languages